"Roxanne's Revenge" is the debut single by American rapper Roxanne Shante. It was produced by a then unknown Marley Marl and released in 1984 through the independent label Pop Art Records. In the song, a 14-year-old Roxanne Shante, whose real name is Lolita Shanté Gooden, responds to UTFO's hit song "Roxanne, Roxanne". In addition to her feud with UTFO, this also caused between 30 and more than 100 "answer songs" from different hip hop artists to be produced at that time (according to different statements), in what would be called "Roxanne Wars".

The song spent 12 weeks on the Billboard R&B singles chart, reaching  22 in March 1985 and becoming Shanté's most successful song as the lead artist on that chart. Roxanne's Revenge sold more than 250,000 copies in the New York area alone.

"Roxanne's Revenge" is frequently regarded as one of rap's best  diss tracks, both of the 1980s and in general.

Background

Single track listing

12" Vinyl

A-Side
 "Just Say Stet" (3:40)
 "Just Say Stet" (Instrumental) (3:44)

B-Side
 "Rock De La Stet" (Vocal) (6:30)

Personnel
Credits are taken from the liner notes and the official page of the ASCAP.
Written By – Glenn Bolton, Arnold Hamilton, Paul Huston, Martin Nemley, Leonardo Roman, Marvin Shahid Wright
Producer – Stetsasonic
Co-producer – Eric Calvi, Robin Halpin (tracks: A1, A2), Jim Klein (track B)
Keyboards, Horns – DBC
Mastered By – Herbie Jr :^)* (Herb Powers Jr.)
Engineer – Eric Calvi
Producer (exec.) – Tom Silverman

References

1984 singles
American hip hop songs
Diss tracks
Songs about revenge